Juneyao Air, formerly known as Juneyao Airlines, is a carrier headquartered in Shanghai, operating both domestic and international services from two airports (Shanghai Hongqiao and Shanghai Pudong). The company was founded in 2005 as a subsidiary of Shanghai JuneYao (Group) Co., Ltd, and started operations in September 2006. It reported a net profit of about CNY1.05 billion ($161.3 million) in 2015.

Corporate affairs
The headquarters are in Changning District, Shanghai.

Destinations

Codeshare agreements
Juneyao Airlines has the following codeshare agreements (as of May 2019).

 Air China
 All Nippon Airways
 China Eastern Airlines
 EVA Air
 Finnair
 Shenzhen Airlines
Juneyao Airlines joined Star Alliance as a Connecting Partner on 23 May 2017.

Fleet

Current fleet

, Juneyao Airlines operates the following aircraft:

The airline took delivery of its first Boeing 787 Dreamliner in October 2018. Juneyao Airlines has previously been an all-Airbus operator.

Former fleet
3 further Airbus A320

9 Air 

9 Air is the low-cost carrier (LCC) subsidiary of Juneyao Airlines.

Incidents and accidents
 On 29 August 2011, the Civil Aviation Administration of China (CAAC) published its investigation report indicating that Juneyao Airlines Flight 1112 refused to follow six consecutive orders from Hongqiao ATC in the span of seven minutes to abort their approach and that the crew on duty breached regulation CCAR-91-R2 of CAAC. The license of the South Korean Captain was permanently revoked in China and the Chinese co-pilot's license was suspended for six months. The CAAC also issued a bulletin to the Korea Transportation Safety Authority formally reporting the Korean captain's misbehavior. The Juneyao Airlines flight refused to abort, despite Qatar Airways flight QR888 declaring a Mayday due to low fuel. Although there was only 5,200 kg of fuel left aboard QR888 after landing, an amount sufficient for another 18 minutes of regular flight plus 30 minutes of reserve, the CAAC indicated that QR888 did not breach any regulations. Nevertheless, the CAAC issued a bulletin to the Civil Aviation Authority of Qatar recommending an improvement in fuel calculation.

References

External links

Official website 

Airlines of China
Airlines established in 2005
Star Alliance
Companies based in Shanghai
Privately held companies of China
Chinese companies established in 2005
Chinese brands